The Kawasaki Ninja ZX-12R is a motorcycle in the Ninja sport bike series made by Kawasaki from 2000 through 2006. It was a contender to be the fastest production motorcycle, and played a role in bringing to a truce the escalating competition to build an ever-faster motorcycle.

Model designation
Usually 1,200 cc Kawasaki sportbike was called ZZ-R1200 in some markets and ZX-12R in others, but the ZX-12R only went by one name. The 2002–2005 Kawasaki ZZ-R1200 touring motorcycle did use this scheme, going by either ZZ-R1200 or ZX-12C. The ZX-12R's R designation followed the race-replica Kawasaki ZX-6R, ZX-7R, ZX-9R, ZX-10R.

Top speed limited by agreement

Apart from the first year of production ZX-12R, the 2000 model year was unrestricted, 2001 onwards its top speed was restricted by a motorcycle manufacturer gentlemen's agreement that was started in late 1999. This was due to a voluntary gentlemen's agreement that included BMW Motorrad and the Japanese manufacturers, amid fears of government regulation of motorcycle speeds mainly in Europe. Prior to the agreement, with rumors of going 200-mph Kawasaki had planned a world press event to launch their answer to Suzuki's Hayabusa, but the event was abruptly cancelled, and instead the ZX-12R with a revised engine control unit that limited speed to about 300 km/h was released with no fanfare or comment by Kawasaki.

Performance
At its introduction the ZX-12R was Kawasaki's flagship sport bike and a competitor to the Suzuki Hayabusa. Its handling and braking matched the power of the engine resulting in a motorcycle that was docile at low speeds and very easy to handle in heavy traffic, but had strong acceleration. The  displacement engine generated  at the rear wheel. Cycle World tested the ZX-12R's  acceleration at 2.59 seconds. They tested the  time at 10.04 seconds, reaching .

Monocoque aluminum frame
While most sport bikes use an aluminum perimeter frame, the ZX-12R uses a unique monocoque aluminum frame. Described by Cycle World in 2000 as a "monocoque backbone...a single large diameter beam" and "Fabricated from a combination of castings and sheet-metal stampings", this was the first use of this type of frame on a mass-produced production motorcycle. This design surpasses the level of chassis strength and stiffness associated with conventional aluminum perimeter frames. Its intention was also to make the bike narrower, and there by more aerodynamic. The design saves space by housing the battery and incorporating an efficient airbox and a cartridge-type air filter that slides into the frame. It was fuel-injected with four Mikuni 46 mm throttle bodies and was Kawasaki's first fuel-injected sport bike since the 1981–1985 GPZ1100.

Model history
The 2002 model was updated with 140 changes. While some of those changes made the bike easier to launch- such as a heavier crankshaft, a reshaped flywheel, and fuel mapping changes- it had  less than the 2000 and 2001 models' . It had a revised suspension with stiffer front fork springs and a softer rear shock spring. The front fender had cosmetic changes, and panels were added to the inner fairing below the instruments and bars. The centrally-located ram-air intake scoop protruding from the fairing that takes advantage of the higher front air pressure was revised. This intake is integrated into a wider and shorter front cowling from Kawasaki Aerospace Company division, lowering the drag coefficient by one point from 33 to 32. The last update was in 2004, with the addition of radial brakes and more fuel injection changes. The ZX-12R was discontinued in 2006, and was followed by the 2006ZX-14 (ZZR1400) which had a similar monocoque frame.

See also
 List of fastest production motorcycles by acceleration

References

Ninja ZX-12R
Sport bikes
Motorcycles introduced in 2000